WNWO-TV (channel 24) is a television station in Toledo, Ohio, United States, affiliated with NBC. Owned by Sinclair Broadcast Group, the station maintains a transmitter on Cousino Road in Jerusalem Township. Its studios are located on South Byrne Road in Toledo, although newscasts have originated from the facilities of sister station and CBS/Fox affiliate WSBT-TV in South Bend, Indiana, since March 2017.

History
Overmyer Broadcasting founded the station on May 3, 1966 as WDHO-TV (for Daniel H. Overmyer). Overmyer also owned 20% of each of three stations that signed on in the 1968–69 period, WATL in Atlanta, WXIX in Cincinnati and WPGH in Pittsburgh. This group was jointly owned with the U.S. Communications Corporation of Philadelphia holding the other 80% of each of the three stations. Logically, WDHO should have signed on either as a full-time ABC or NBC station. However, the Federal Communications Commission (FCC) had just required all-channel tuning two years earlier. As a result, even though Toledo was big enough to support three full network affiliates, NBC opted to retain its secondary affiliations with WSPD-TV (channel 13, now WTVG) and CBS affiliate WTOL (channel 11), and have WIMA-TV (now WLIO) in Lima cover the southern part of the Toledo market. ABC opted to retain its primary affiliation with WSPD-TV. Instead, WDHO signed on as the unlikely flagship of "The Overmyer Network," very soon renamed "The United Network" (no relation to Chris-Craft Industries' United Television division or UPN), which began operations one year later on May 1, 1967. The sole program on The United Network, The Las Vegas Show starring comedian Bill Dana, was canceled along with the network after being on the air for only a month.

WDHO then became Toledo's first independent station, carrying syndicated and local programming plus any network shows WSPD-TV and WTOL turned down. Finally, in 1969, WDHO persuaded ABC to move all its programming there. However, outside circumstances stunted any progress WDHO tried to make against their VHF competition. Its fortunes were hampered by the easy availability of then-ABC O&O station WXYZ-TV from Detroit over-the-air and on some cable systems in the Toledo market, which provided northwest Ohio ABC viewers with a higher-quality signal than WDHO could hope to have. WEWS-TV in Cleveland and WPTA in Fort Wayne, Indiana also transmitted Grade B signals in parts of the area.

As a result, channel 24 spent most of its tenure as an ABC affiliate in the ratings basement. The station also struggled financially as well. On several occasions, creditors nearly forced the station into receivership. At one point, the portable building housing its news department was in danger of repossession.

Overmyer Broadcasting declared bankruptcy during the 1980s. WDHO was seized by the Bank of Boston (now part of Bank of America) in 1982. The Bank of Boston sold the station through bankruptcy to a local group, Toledo Television Investors, Ltd. for $19.6 million in 1986. The new owners changed the station's call letters to the current WNWO-TV on June 1, 1986. However, the change in call letters did not bring a change in the station's fortunes, and channel 24 remained the third station in what was essentially a two-station market. (Exposure on cable in some of the more southern Downriver Detroit suburbs didn't help much either, even when the Trenton lineup of United Cable Television could only receive channel 24 due to a perimeter law.)

NBC affiliation
In May 1994, Fox (which had recently outbid CBS for rights to broadcast certain NFL games) signed a groundbreaking affiliation deal with New World Communications; CBS affiliates WJBK and WJW-TV were included in the deal. CBS heavily wooed WXYZ and WEWS to drop their decades-long affiliations with ABC and switch to CBS. Fearing that it would be relegated to UHF in Detroit and Cleveland, ABC cut a deal to buy WTVG, which provides at least Grade B coverage to most of the southern portion of the Detroit market. This prompted ABC to renew its affiliations with both WXYZ and WEWS in exchange for affiliating with Scripps-owned stations WMAR-TV in Baltimore, WFTS-TV in Tampa and KNXV-TV in Phoenix. When it was apparent that WTOL was uninterested in switching to NBC, WNWO approached NBC with an affiliation offer. More or less by default, NBC accepted. On October 28, 1995, WNWO switched to NBC, and WTVG moved to ABC. The last ABC program to air on WNWO was Nightline at 11:35 p.m. on October 27, while the first NBC program to air on the station was Saturday Today at 8:00 a.m. on October 28.

 Ironically, since it was the result of an unsolicited offer, the network swap increased WNWO's value. NBC was still the top-rated network at the time. Toledo Television Investors then sold WNWO to Malrite Communications Group in 1996, which merged with Raycom Media in 1998. However, that company owned Fox affiliate WUPW at the time and had to sell it because the FCC did not allow duopolies at the time. WNWO was once again put up for sale in 2005 after Raycom announced that it would acquire the Liberty Corporation, owner of WTOL. Raycom couldn't keep both stations because the FCC does not allow one person to own two of the four largest stations in a market. Raycom chose to keep WTOL because of CBS' and even more so WTOL's higher ratings at the time. On March 27, 2006, the company announced that Barrington Broadcasting would be acquiring 12 Raycom stations, including WNWO. The group deal was finalized on August 11. As a result, WNWO joined Marquette's WLUC-TV, Saginaw's WEYI-TV, and Northern Michigan's WPBN-TV / WTOM-TV as part of Barrington's family of stations serving Michigan. (Coincidentally, Raycom would regain control of WUPW in 2012 through a shared services agreement with WTOL.)

Also in 2006, WNWO began airing The Tube (a 24-hour music video channel) on its second digital subchannel. This would end on October 1, 2007 when The Tube shut down. This slot then became the Retro Television Network, and later (in March 2016) the American Sports Network. On June 12, 2009, the main channel turned off its analog signal forever. The station's digital signal remained at channel 49 following the digital transition. However, it can be tuned to channel 24 using PSIP.

In early 2010, WNWO-TV applied to double its power output from 59 kW to 118 kW after the station had complained of potential co-channel interference from WDLI-TV in Canton, which was proposing to move from channel 39 to channel 49.

In May 2011, WNWO began showing some of their syndicated programming in high definition.

In July 2011, WNWO unveiled a brand new logo. The new logo is of a blue square with the call letters WNWO inside of it. The logo change is part of a complete rebranding of the station, which had been known as "NBC 24" since the 1995 affiliation switch.

On February 28, 2013, Barrington Broadcasting announced the sale of its entire group, including WNWO-TV, to Sinclair Broadcast Group. The sale was completed on November 25. On April 21, 2014, Sinclair Broadcast Group announced that a new management team has been put into place at WNWO to help grow and improve the station's position in the Northwest Ohio television Market. The new management team included a new general manager, news director, general sales manager, digital content manager, and promotions director.

On July 28, 2014, it was officially announced that longtime Toledo news anchor Laura Emerson would return to Toledo and join WNWO as evening co-anchor. Emerson was the evening anchor at WUPW for over 16 years before leaving the station in 2012. Emerson's first newscast at WNWO was on August 10, 2014. She departed the station with WNWO's move to a different anchoring model (described below) on March 10, 2017.

News operation
WNWO-TV presently broadcasts 8½ hours of locally produced newscasts each week (with 1½ hours each weekday and one hour on Sundays), with a half-hour weekday morning show and half-hour 6 p.m. and 11 p.m. shows.

While owned by Malrite, the company invested heavily in its property reportedly spending (according to the station's present owner) $3 million to upgrade the station. The station went from a newsroom of eight people and one half-hour newscast a day to over thirty people and three hours of news a day. In 1997, the completely revamped news operation went on-air with anchors Dan Lovett and Lissa Guyton, "Blizzard" Bill Spencer presenting the weather, and Jim Tichy (the only hold over from the previous news department) presenting sports. Despite a large advertising campaign with the slogan "Building A Better Station For You", the revamped newscast did not do much better than its predecessor in the ratings. It continued to trail WTOL and WTVG by wide margins (and at times trailed WUPW's then in-house news operation as well). There was a lot of turnover on the anchor desk and a number of personalities (including Jon Clark, Angela Atalla, and Nora Murray) left the station.

On November 29, 2016, Sinclair announced that it planned to, in early 2017, outsource the technical operations for WNWO's newscasts to the facilities of sister station WSBT-TV in South Bend, Indiana. Sinclair stated that it would maintain a local news staff of 11 employees, and that redundant staff would be laid off. Sinclair stated that these changes would "improve both the news product and production efficiencies".

The changes took effect on-air on March 6, 2017; the newscasts are now presented from a secondary studio in South Bend and anchored by Aaron Leedy and Julianna Furfarri on the weekdays and John Lasko on the Sunday newscasts. WNWO also shortened its morning news to a half-hour, and dropped its 5:00 p.m. and Saturday broadcasts. Weathercasts however remain based in full from Toledo.

Notable former on-air staff
Jodine Costanzo (now at WPXI in Pittsburgh)
David Custer (now with WNEM-TV in Saginaw, Michigan) 
Allison Payne (retired from WGN-TV in Chicago, now deceased)
Paul W. Smith (now at WJR in Detroit)
Anna Kooiman (was at Fox News in New York City)

Subchannels
The station's digital signal is multiplexed:

Carriage dispute
December 15, 2013 saw the expiration and non-renewal of the retransmission contract between WNWO-TV and local cable company Buckeye CableSystem. With the two unable to reach an agreement on a monetary price to continue WNWO's cable coverage, Buckeye had to drop the station (at Sinclair's request, as per FCC regulations, which state a station cannot be retransmitted without its permission/consent) and blacked out any NBC programming aired on Detroit's WDIV-TV (also carried on cable) with QVC content. WNWO's standard- and high-definition channels were replaced by those of CBET-DT (the CBC Television O&O) in nearby Windsor, Ontario, Canada. This allowed Buckeye to provide coverage of the 2014 Winter Olympics and the 2014 Stanley Cup Playoffs via CBC to their customers. Cable coverage of both events on NBCUniversal's cable properties such as NBCSN, USA Network and CNBC was unaffected by the dispute, as NBCU's carriage agreements for their cable networks were unrelated in whole to the WNWO dispute; NBC programming was still also available on the provider next-day via video on demand through those same carriage agreements.

On July 14, 2014, the carriage dispute between Sinclair Broadcast Group and Buckeye CableSystem officially ended with the two parties coming up with a new two-year agreement. As a result of the agreement, Buckeye CableSystem subscribers in the Toledo area began receiving the WNWO-TV signal once again. CBET, whose standard- and high-definition channels were part of the Buckeye CableSystem line-up prior to the dispute, had both versions remaining on the system, though relocated to different channel positions.

References

External links

NBC network affiliates
Charge! (TV network) affiliates
Comet (TV network) affiliates
TBD (TV network) affiliates
NWO-TV
Sinclair Broadcast Group
Television channels and stations established in 1966